Reginald Thomas Guy Des Voeux Paget, Baron Paget of Northampton, QC (2 September 1908 – 2 January 1990), also known as Reginald Guy Thomas Du Voeux Paget, was a British lawyer and Labour politician.

Career 
The son of Major Guy Paget, he was educated at Eton and Trinity College, Cambridge, where he read law, but did not graduate. Paget joined the Labour Party whilst he was an undergraduate at Cambridge, a decision made striking by the fact that his family had produced five generations of Conservative MPs. He was called to the bar in 1934.

He stood as the Labour candidate for Northampton in 1935, but was not elected. During World War II he served in the Royal Naval Volunteer Reserve (1940–43). 
After the war, he was advocate for Field Marshal Erich von Manstein during his trial for war crimes. He later wrote Manstein: His Campaigns and His Trial (1957). He took silk in 1947.

He stood again as the Labour candidate for Northampton ten years later in 1945, and won the seat. He was repeatedly re-elected until 1974, when the constituency was abolished. From 1960 to 1964, Paget successively served as junior opposition spokesman for the Royal Navy and the Army. He was an outspoken critic of Harold Wilson during the 1963 Labour Party leadership election.

During his tenure in the House of Commons, he was an independent voice, playing a major role in the campaign to abolish capital punishment. He was a strong opponent of the execution of Derek Bentley and argued for Timothy Evans to be posthumously pardoned for the murder of his child (a crime widely believed to have been committed by John Christie).

Paget was initially supportive of British entry into the European Economic Community (EEC), and in 1954 became Secretary of the UK Council of the European Movement. However, in later years his views changed: in 1971 he was one of the majority of Labour MPs to vote against membership, and during the 1975 EEC referendum campaign he gave a speech in the House of Lords in which he stated that the EEC was impotent in the face of the Soviet threat; in the resulting vote a day later he was one of only 20 peers to vote against remaining in the EEC.

On 2 January 1975, he was created a life peer as Baron Paget of Northampton, of Lubenham in the County of Leicestershire.

Paget was said to be the slowest speaker in the House of Commons and was master of the Pytchley Hunt from 1968 to 1971, an unusual position for a Labour MP.

Family 
In 1931, he married Sybil Helen Gibbons (Nancy), daughter of Sills Clifford Gibbons. They occupied Lubenham Lodge 2 miles west of Market Harborough from 1964. He later separated from his wife, and had a relationship with Diana Spearman, widow of the Conservative MP Sir Alexander Spearman.

Arms

References

Further reading 

 "Lord Paget of Northampton", The Times (London), 4 January 1990, p. 14.

External links 

 

1908 births
1990 deaths
Alumni of Trinity College, Cambridge
Paget of Northampton
Labour Party (UK) MPs for English constituencies
Members of the Privy Council of the United Kingdom
UK MPs 1945–1950
UK MPs 1950–1951
UK MPs 1951–1955
UK MPs 1955–1959
UK MPs 1959–1964
UK MPs 1964–1966
UK MPs 1966–1970
UK MPs 1970–1974
UK MPs who were granted peerages
English King's Counsel
20th-century English lawyers
Life peers created by Elizabeth II
People educated at Eton College
English barristers